"Mama's Never Seen Those Eyes" is a song written by Terry Skinner and J. L. Wallace and recorded by American country music group The Forester Sisters.  It was released in March 1986 as the fourth single from the album The Forester Sisters.  The song was The Forester Sisters' third number one on the country chart.  The single went to number one for one week and spent a total of fifteen weeks within the top 40.

Chart performance

References

1986 singles
1985 songs
The Forester Sisters songs
Warner Records singles
Songs written by Terry Skinner
Songs written by J. L. Wallace